Darreh (also Romanized as Derreh; also known as Derāh and Dow Rāh) is a village in Chahar Cheshmeh Rural District, Kamareh District, Khomeyn County, Markazi Province, Iran. At the 2006 census, its population was 97, in 22 families.

References 

Populated places in Khomeyn County